Jürgen Brähmer (born 5 October 1978) is a German professional boxer. He is a two-time former light-heavyweight world champion, having held the WBO title from 2009 to 2011, and the WBA (Regular) title from 2013 to 2016. Additionally, he has held the European light-heavyweight title twice, in 2009 and 2013.

Amateur career
As an amateur, Brähmer accumulated 95 wins in 100 fights including victories against Ricky Hatton in 1996, Felix Sturm in 1997 and Carl Froch in the final at the German championship in 1998.

Professional career

Early career
Brähmer went undefeated in his first 27 professional fights, losing for the first time to fellow German Mario Veit by majority decision in May 2006. Brähmer avenged the loss a year later, beating Veit with a fourth-round knockout. Brähmer's first title challenge came against WBA light heavyweight champion Hugo Garay. Brähmer started the fight well but as the rounds went on, Garay was more consistent and he secured a unanimous decision in the end. The bout was broadcast by ZDF.

WBO light heavyweight champion
Brähmer won the EBU title on his next fight, beating Rachid Kanfouah with a round 5 technical knockout. Brähmer won the WBO interim light heavyweight title by knocking out Aleksy Kuziemski on 22 August 2009. On 13 November 2009, Brähmer became the WBO world light heavyweight world champion after the title was vacated by Zsolt Erdei, who moved up to cruiserweight. Brähmer successfully defended the title on 19 December 2009, winning a unanimous decision over Dmitry Sukhotsky and then again in 2010 against Mariano Plotinsky.

In January 2010, Brähmer was sentenced to 16 months in prison due to two separate instances of assault. During this time, the WBO issued an interim title, which was won by Nathan Cleverly. Brähmer was due to face Cleverly on 21 May 2011, but Brähmer withdrew from the bout the week of the fight citing an eye injury. Brähmer had previously called off a unification bout against Beibut Shumenov on less than a weeks' notice, citing "acute gastrointestinal illness". Due to his withdrawal, the WBO stripped Brähmer of his title and awarded it to Cleverly.

WBA (Regular) light heavyweight champion
Brähmer returned to the ring in January 2012, beating Jose Maria Guerrero by round 4 TKO. Brähmer went on to reclaim the European title against Eduard Gutknecht in February 2013.

After Beibut Shumenov was elevated to Super champion status by the WBA, Brahmer was given the chance to fight for the vacant WBA (Regular) title. In December 2013, he defeated Marcus Oliveira in Germany to claim the world title. He went on to successfully defend it against Enzo Maccarinelli, Roberto Bolonti, Pawel Glazewski, Robin Krasniqi, Konni Konrad, and Eduard Gutknecht on a rematch, winning four of those fights by stoppage. Brähmer lost the WBA title on October 1, 2016, to Nathan Cleverly. This was his seventh defence of the title. Brähmer retired on his stool after round 6, claiming a shoulder injury. A rematch was talked about following the fight.

World Boxing Super Series

In July 2017, Brähmer joined the super middleweight World Boxing Super Series. Brähmer hadn't fought at super middleweight in roughly a decade. He fought Rob Brant in the first round of the tournament, beating him by unanimous decision. He had to withdraw from the next fight and therefore the series due to an influenzal infection.

In his first fight after dropping out of the WBSS, Brähmer fought veteran Pablo Nievas in Hamburg, Germany. It was an easy win for the German, who was in control throughout the fight and managed to force the referee to stop the fight with a flurry of punches towards Nievas in the fifth round.

In his next fight, Brähmer again won comfortably, this time bz way of knockout, flooring his opponent Kadrija in the second round with a vicious shot in the liver.

Brähmer scored his fourth win in a row over Jürgen Doberstein, on 21 December 2019. Brähmer scored a seventh-round KO win and looked impressive doing it, stating that he is ready for another world title run.

Professional boxing record

References

External links

Jürgen Brähmer - Profile, News Archive & Current Rankings at Box.Live

1978 births
World Boxing Organization champions
Living people
German male boxers
Super-middleweight boxers
European Boxing Union champions
World Boxing Association champions
World light-heavyweight boxing champions